The North Wales Championships were originally founded as the Vale of Clwyd CLTC Open Tournament in 1881. In 1883 that tournament became known as the North Wales Counties Challenge Cup until 1884 when it was renamed as the North Wales Challenge Cup until 1886. This first edition of the event lapsed, but was then revived by the Criccieth LTC at Criccieth in 1891 under its new name until 1939 when it was discontinued.

History
In September 1881 the Vale of Clwyd CLTC (f.1881), at Ruthin, Vale of Clwyd, North Wales organised the Vale of Clwyd CLTC Open Tournament. In 1883 at what was then, the third edition of the event, the club inaugurated the North Wales Counties Challenge Cup for men at Denbigh.

In 1884 the tournament was renamed as the North Wales Challenge Cup. It continued to be staged until 1886. In 1891 the Criccieth Lawn Tennis Club (formally established in 1892) at Criccieth revived the North Wales 
Challenge Cup as the North Wales Championships, that ran until 1939.

Results
Incomplete Roll

Mens Singles

Mens Doubles
 

Incomplete Roll

Women's Singles

Mix Doubles

References

Defunct tennis tournaments in the United Kingdom
Grass court tennis tournaments
Tennis tournaments in Wales